George Washington Mordecai (April 18, 1844 - June 14, 1920) served in the California State Assembly for the 70th district from 1891 to 1893 and the 62nd district from 1893 to 1895 and during the American Civil War he served in the Army of the Confederate States of America.

Life
Mordecai was born into an Ashkenazi Jewish family, the son of Jacob Mordecai and Rebecca Myers Mordecai. His sister Emma was an educator, slave owner, and supporter of the Confederacy. Mordecai converted to Christianity and attended Christ Church (Episcopal) in Raleigh. He owned several enslaved people, paying bills and serving as an agent for his nephews Henry and Jacob, both of whom owned slave plantations.

References

1844 births
1920s deaths
19th-century American politicians
American Ashkenazi Jews
American Episcopalians
American people of English descent
American people of English-Jewish descent
American people of German-Jewish descent
Confederate States Army personnel
Converts to Anglicanism from Judaism
Jewish-American slave owners
Jewish Confederates
Democratic Party members of the California State Assembly
Mordecai family